In schools, the science technician is the person who prepares the practical equipment and makes up the solutions used in school science labs. The role also includes instructing and assisting teachers with practical skills, including class demonstrations, for advanced techniques across all disciplines. Many are very well qualified and have degrees, such as a Bachelor's degree (B.A. or B.Sc), Master's degree (M.Sc.) or even a Doctorate (Dr) and/or other professional qualifications such as the HNC, HND and NVQ. 

Their main duties include:
 Care of living organisms
 Making up solutions
 School science experiments and demonstrations
 Inventory
 Budget and Accounts
 Repairing and constructing laboratory equipment

In December 2002 CLEAPSS commissioned a survey into the Specific Job roles of Science Technicians. The pdf Document G228 - Technicians and their jobs which can be freely downloaded was released and later updated in 2009. The guide was written to help promote a professional technician service in schools and colleges.

See also
 Science education

References

External links
 CLEAPSS - The School Science Advisory Service providing practical advice & help on safety in Science
 ASE - Professional Organisation for Teachers and Technicians

Education and training occupations
Science occupations